The Patricia Reser Center for the Arts (previously known as the Beaverton Center for the Arts) is an arts center near The Round in Beaverton, Oregon, United States.

History
Plans for the center were approved by the Beaverton Planning Commission in February 2019, and its cost was projected to be $46 million. The grand opening was held in March 2022.

Funding
Pat Reser contributed $13 million to the project via the Reser Family Foundation. The Washington County Visitors Association contributed $500,000 to the project's construction in April 2019. The state contributed $1.5 million, allocated from the Oregon Lottery, in July.

References

External links

 The Patricia Reser Center for the Arts, Beaverton Arts Foundation
 Patricia Reser Center for the Arts (November 7, 2018), Architect Magazine, American Institute of Architects

2022 establishments in Oregon
Arts centers in Oregon
Buildings and structures completed in 2022
Buildings and structures in Beaverton, Oregon